Marimar Estate  is a Californian winery located in Sonoma County, owned by Marimar Torres, the sister of Miguel A. Torres, President of Bodegas Torres.

History
In 1986 Marimar Torres embarked on a project to plant a  vineyard on the western hills of DO Russian River Valley, in Green Valley AVA, sub-appellation of Sonoma County, very close to the Pacific: with a cold microclimate that is suitable for Chardonnay and Pinot noir. The vineyard is called Don Miguel, after her father, Miguel Torres Carbó, who oversaw the worldwide expansion of the Torres family business. Of the vineyards 60 acres 30 are planted with Chardonnay and the other 30 with Pinot noir.

Vineyards
Don Miguel Vineyard:

Marimar came to live in California in 1975. After two years of searching, she acquired the land and began planting the vineyard in 1986. Today there are 30 acres planted with Chardonnay and 30 with Pinot Noir. The wines are made entirely from estate-grown grapes. Named in honor of the late patriarch of the family, the vineyard is unique in California because it is totally European in style. The vines are trained very close to the ground on an open vertical trellis, following the slope of an east-facing hillside; the rootstocks are phylloxera resistant; and the planting density is 2000 vines per acre, four times more than is traditional in California. Such high density promotes root competition and diminishes vigor, naturally reducing the output per vine.

Yields are low and labor is intensive, but the vines live longer and produce grapes with greater concentration of flavors, more refined and elegant aromas, and better balance. To contribute complexity, Marimar did extensive research to select several clones of each varietal: See, Rued and Spring Mountain for Chardonnay; and Cristina 88, Swan, Pommard, Lee, Dijon 115 and Dijon 667 for Pinot Noir. Each clone brings different attributes to the final blend, resulting in wines with deep layers of flavor.

The Doña Margarita Vineyard:

Named after Marimar's mother, was planted in 2002 in the Freestone Valley of the Sonoma Coast AVA. Although the estate has , only 12 of these have been earmarked for vines and planted with Pinot noir. A large area of the estate remains uncultivated with wildlife and indigenous plant species.

At the Sonoma vineyard, the estate utilizes traditional Mediterranean viticultural practices, such as a vertical trellis for the vines, the choice of rootstocks that are more resistant to phylloxera and a planting density of 2 m x 1m (2,000 vines per acre). Since 2003 both vineyards have been subject to organic cultivation.

Winery
Built in 1992 with a capacity of 15,000 cases, the winery sits on a hill surrounded by vines. The production wing is outfitted with carefully selected equipment, to allow the control essential to producing a wine based on minimal handling. Its three barrel rooms with independent temperature and humidity controls provide flexibility to experiment with various vinification techniques, in order to best express the fruit's character.

The reception wing, decorated with antique winemaking equipment, furniture, and crockery brought over from Catalonia, includes a professional kitchen and a spacious dining room with a great fireplace. It was here, in the old Catalan tradition, that family and staff would gather every evening to discuss the events of a day spent in the countryside. The winery is now open seven days a week for tastings and tours are available by appointment. We love to receive customers and friends with a genuine interest in wine!

References

Further reading
 Article in the Diario El Mundo. Magazine. La española que triunfa en California (The Spanish Woman who has triumphed in California). No. 425. Sunday 18 November 2007
 Magazine Todo Vino.com. Marimar Torres: Soy la prueba más clara de que se puede sobrevivir sin Parker (I'm the living proof that you can survive without Parker), September 2007
 Magazine (ask?) Comer& Beber. Marimar Torres, seducida por California (Marimar Torres, Seduced by California), December 2006
 
 Article in the newspaper La Vanguardia: Torres juega fuerte en California (Torres, Playing to Win in California). Date: 1/01/2003

External links
 Marimar Estate website (in English and Spanish)

Wineries in Sonoma County